Zhang Ding (born 1980) is a Chinese artist.

Zhang was born in 1980 in Zhangye, Gansu, China, and is based in Shanghai.  He graduated from Oil Painting department of Northwest Minzu University in 2003. During 2003–2004, he studied at the China Academy of Art. In 2016, Zhang Ding founded the art label CON TROL CLUB.

Zhang Ding's exhibitions and projects often include videos, sculptures, installations, paintings, real time renderings and live performances.

Solo exhibitions

 2019

High-Speed Forms, OCAT Shanghai, Shanghai

2018

Safe House, Beijing

 2017

Vortex, ShanghART, Shanghai

 2016

Zhang Ding: Devouring Time, RAM HIGHLIGHT 2016, Rockbund Art Museum, Shanghai

Enter the Dragon II,  K11 Art Museum, Shanghai

ZHANG Ding- 18 Cubes, Solo Project in Art Basel HK 2016 Encounter Section, Hong Kong Convention & Exhibition Centre, Hong Kong

 2015

Enter the Dragon, ICA, London, UK

Black Substance, Shanghai Museum of Glass, Shanghai

 2014

Zhang Ding: Orbit of Rock, ShanghART, Beijing

Orbit, The Armory Show, Focus Section, New York, U.S.A.

 2013

Gold & Silver, Galerie Krinzinger, Austria

 2012

Buddha Jumps over the Wall, Top Contemporary Art Centre, Shanghai

 2011

Opening, ShanghART H- Space, Shanghai

 2009

Law, ShanghART, Beijing

 2008

ZhangDing, Wind, Krinzinger Projecte, Vienna, Austria

 2007

Tools, ShanghART, Shanghai

N Kilometers Towards the West, 2006, ShanghART F- Space, Shanghai

 2006

My Photographs Exhibition, Shanghai

 2005

Big City, BizArt, Shanghai

Prizes

 2015  TANC Asia Prize Winner;

 2017  Porsche Young Chinese Artist of the Year Prize Winner.

Collection
Multimedia Art Museum, Moscow, Russia
Astrup Fearnley Museum, Oslo, Norway
DSL Collection, Beijing
Guy & Myriam Ullens Foundation, Switzerland

References

External links
 Zhang Ding Studio
 CON TROL CLUB

1980 births
Living people
People from Zhangye
Artists from Gansu
China Academy of Art alumni